Alderley may refer to several places:

Australia 
Alderley, Queensland

United Kingdom 
Alderley, Cheshire
Alderley, Gloucestershire

United States 
Alderley, Wisconsin

See also

United Kingdom 
Alderley Edge, Cheshire
Over Alderley, Cheshire
Nether Alderley, Cheshire